Cécile Guilbert (born 1963) is a French writer and literary critic. She studied at Sciences-Po Paris. She has written a number of books on writers who are esprits libres or "free spirits": Saint Simon, Guy Debord, Laurence Sterne and Andy Warhol. She won the Prix Médicis de l'essai for Warhol spirit.She has also written novels such as Le Musée National (2000) and Réanimation (2012). She has written for France Culture, Canal Plus, Monde des Livres and Magazine Littéraire.

As of 2021, Guilbert sits on the jury of the Prix Renaudot.

In 2022, she made her acting debut in Albert Serra's drama film Pacifiction.

Works
 1994 : Saint-Simon ou l’encre de la subversion, Gallimard
 1996 : Pour Guy Debord, Gallimard
 2000 : Le musée national, Gallimard
 2004 : L’écrivain le plus libre, Gallimard
 2008 : Warhol spirit, Grasset (Prix Médicis de l'essai)
 2012 : Réanimation, Grasset

References

21st-century French writers
Sciences Po alumni
Prix Médicis essai winners
Living people
1963 births